Joka is a metro station of the Kolkata Metro. The station is located in Joka. It will be the terminal station of the Kolkata Metro Line 3 till the phase 2 of the project. In phase 3, the line will be extended 2 km more, till Diamond Park. The station was commissioned on 30 December 2022.

History 
Purple Line was approved in the railway budget for the financial year 2010-2011 and Rs 2,6519 crore was allocated for the construction work. In October 2011, NVRL won the tender for the construction of the Metro Corridor from Joka metro station to Esplanade metro station along with the Joka metro station.

Trial runs on the 6.5-km Joka-Taratla stretch of Kolkata Metro's Purple Line began in mid-September 2022, and it received mandatory Commissioner of Railway Safety (CRS) clearance in November.

Prime Minister Narendra Modi inaugurated the Joka-Taratala stretch, including Joka metro station of Kolkata Metro's Purple Line on 30th December 2022 in the presence of West Bengal Chief Minister Mamata Banerjee and Indian Railway Minister Ashwini Vaishnaw. Some students from schools like St Thomas Boys School were granted the rare opportunity to be the first ones to ride in this Joka-Taratala stretch after the inauguration.

Station layout

Depot

References 

Kolkata Metro stations
Railway stations opened in 2013
Railway stations in Kolkata